Odu is a studio album by Nigerian Jùjú musician King Sunny Adé. It was released in 1998 on Mesa/Atlantic. Recorded at Dockside Studios, Maurice, Louisiana, it was produced by Andrew Frankel and features traditional Yoruba music. Odù means oracle in the Yoruba divination system of Ifá.

Leo Stanley of Allmusic gave Odu a star rating of four stars out of five. He described it as a "rich, diverse album". In 1999, the album was nominated for a Grammy Award in the Best World Music Album category.

Track listing
"Jigi Jigi Isapa" — 5:36
"Easy Motion Tourist" — 5:59
"Alaji Rasaki" — 5:19
"Mo Ri Keke Kan" — 4:04
"Kiti Kiti" — 6:18
"Natuba" — 6:15
"Aiye Nreti Eleya Mi" — 12:50
"Ibi Won Ri O" — 3:33
"Kawa to Bere" — 5:32
"Eri Okan (Conscience)" — 9:56
"Kini Mba Ro" — 4:35

References

1998 albums
King Sunny Adé albums
Yoruba music